The Earle Grey Award is the lifetime achievement award for television acting of the Canadian Screen Awards, and its predecessor the Gemini Awards. It can be presented to an individual or collaborative team (such as SCTV or Royal Canadian Air Farce).

The award was named in honour of Earle Grey, an actor and theatre director who founded the Earle Grey Players theatre troupe and had served as the first president of ACTRA's local chapter in Toronto.

The award was first presented by the ACTRA Awards in 1972, as the award for best performance in a television film within the annual eligibility period. In the earliest years it was the only acting award presented by the ACTRA Awards, although it was later supplemented with an award for best performance in a television series. Beginning in 1983, separate categories were introduced for performances by actors and actresses in television films; when the ACTRA Awards were taken over by the Gemini Awards beginning in 1986, the Earle Grey Award name was then transitioned into the Geminis' lifetime achievement award instead of being retained as the name for the primary annual acting awards.

Nominations for the award are presented by professionals within the Canadian television community and the decision of who will win the award is made by a special committee.

Recipients

ACTRA Awards
1972 - Geneviève Bujold
1973 - Gordon Pinsent, The Rowdyman
1974 - Jackie Burroughs, Vicky
1975 - William Hutt, The National Dream
1976 - Jayne Eastwood, The Last of the Four Letter Words
1977 - Sean Sullivan, Of the Fields, Lately
1978 - Donald Sutherland, Bethune
1979 - Helen Burns, Catsplay
1980 - Don Francks, Drying Up the Streets
1981 - Al Waxman, The Winnings of Frankie Walls
1982 - Lally Cadeau, You've Come a Long Way, Katie
1983 - Rosemary Dunsmore, Blind Faith
1984 - Kenneth Welsh, Empire, Inc. (actor); Linda Griffiths, Empire, Inc. (actress)
1985 - Douglas Rain, A Flush of Tories (actor); Susan Wright, Slim Obsession (actress)
1986 - Maury Chaykin, Canada's Sweetheart: The Saga of Hal C. Banks (actor); Leueen Willoughby, The Other Kingdom (actress)

Gemini Awards
1986 - Ed McNamara
1987 - Lorne Greene
1988 - Kate Reid
1989 - Sean McCann
1990 - Jan Rubeš
1992 - Colleen Dewhurst (posthumous award)
1993 - Barbara Hamilton
1994 - Ernie Coombs (Mr. Dressup)
1995 - Cast of SCTV: Rick Moranis, Eugene Levy, Andrea Martin, Martin Short, Joe Flaherty, Catherine O'Hara, John Candy (posthumous), Harold Ramis, Dave Thomas.
1996 - Bruno Gerussi (posthumous) 
1997 - Gordon Pinsent
1998 - Kenneth Welsh and Al Waxman
1999 - Jayne Eastwood
2000 - Cast and writers of Royal Canadian Air Farce: Ron Mann, Roger Abbott, Luba Goy, Don Ferguson, John Morgan.
2001 - Jackie Burroughs
2002 - Members of CODCO: Tommy Sexton (posthumous), Andy Jones, Greg Malone 
2003 - Jennifer Dale
2004 - Graham Greene
2005 - Steve Smith
2006 - Donnelly Rhodes
2007 - Don Harron
2008 - David Gardner 
2009 - Eric Peterson
2010 - Not awarded
2011 - Cedric Smith

Canadian Screen Awards
2012 - Not awarded
2013 - Not awarded
2014 - Colm Feore
2015 - Paul Gross
2016 - Wendy Crewson
2017 - Tantoo Cardinal
2018 - Clark Johnson
2019 - Tina Keeper
2022 - Peter MacNeill

References

External links
 Academy database

Canadian Screen Award television categories
Lifetime achievement awards
ACTRA Awards